Michael Carolan (1875 – 01 May 1937) was an Irish republican activist.

Born in Belfast, Carolan joined the Irish Volunteers in 1914, then participated in the Easter Rising, although as part of the Belfast Division, he did not see any action.  Following the rising, he was arrested and sent to the Frongoch internment camp.  On his return to Belfast, he joined the Irish Republican Army (IRA) and Sinn Féin.

Carolan stood for Sinn Féin in Belfast Shankill at the 1918 Irish general election.  This was a unionist stronghold, and he took only 3.8% of the vote.  At the 1920 Belfast Corporation election, he was one of five Sinn Féin candidates elected,  That year he was one of four anti treaty IRA men arrested in the Gaiety Theatre, Dublin. Carolan was wounded in  the hip and imprisoned at Mountjoy Prison. He took part in a hunger strike in protest.

Carolan stood in Belfast North at the 1921 Northern Ireland general election, but was not close to election.  An opponent of the Anglo-Irish Treaty, he became Director of Intelligence for the anti-treaty forces in the Irish Civil War, then filled the same post for the surviving IRA.

In 1925, he was involved in planning to break IRA prisoners out of Mountjoy, but was arrested and himself imprisoned for a year, many IRA intelligence papers being obtained by British authorities.  Frank Kerlin replaced him as Director of Intelligence, but George Gilmore arranged a successful jailbreak in November and Carolan was one of nineteen men sprung in November.

References

1875 births
1930 deaths
Early Sinn Féin politicians
Irish Republican Army (1919–1922) members
Irish Republican Army (1922–1969) members
Members of Belfast City Council
Politicians from Belfast
Sinn Féin councillors in Northern Ireland
Sinn Féin parliamentary candidates